Sinoporus is an extinct genus of predaceous diving beetles in the family Dytiscidae. There is one described species in Sinoporus, S. lineatus.

References

Dytiscidae